St Peter's Church is in the village of Leck, Lancashire, England. It is an active Anglican parish church in the deanery of Tunstall, the archdeaconry of Lancaster and the diocese of Blackburn. Its benefice is united with those of St Wilfrid, Melling, St John the Baptist, Tunstall, St James the Less, Tatham, the Good Shepherd, Lowgill, and Holy Trinity, Wray, to form the benefice of East Lonsdale. The church is recorded in the National Heritage List for England as a designated Grade II listed building.

History

The first church on the site was built in 1610; it was a small single-storeyed building. In 1825 it was extended and a small tower was added. The present church was built in 1878–79, and was designed by the Lancaster architects Paley and Austin. It cost £3,000, and provided seating for 224 people. The church was damaged by fire in October 1913 and rebuilt by 1915 at a cost of about £5,000, it is said accurately to the original design, by Austin, Paley and Austin the successors in the Lancaster practice, Austin and Paley.

Architecture

Exterior
The church is constructed in sandstone rubble with a slate roof. Its plan consists of a nave with a north aisle and a timber south porch, a chancel at a lower level with a vestry on the north side, and a west tower. The tower is in two stages, and is surmounted by a plain parapet and an octagonal slated spire. In the lower stage is a three-light west window containing Perpendicular tracery. The upper stage contains single-light bell openings. Along the south wall of the nave are four-light windows, and the chancel wall contains windows of three lights and one light. The east window has eight lights.

Interior
Inside the church a five-bay arcade divides the nave from the north aisle. The timber roof is open. The sandstone font is octagonal. Much of the stained glass survived the fire, and it was reinstated by Powells who used Henry Holiday's original drawings. The original organ was built some time between 1850 and 1881 by Henry Jones. The present two-manual organ was built in 1915 by Harrison & Harrison. There is a ring of five bells, all cast in 1914 by John Taylor & Co.

External features
The churchyard contains nineteenth century "fever graves" (those of three girls from the Clergy Daughters' School at Cowan Bridge). The former Bishop of Newcastle in Australia Josiah Pearson was Vicar of Leck from 1893 until his death in 1895, and is buried in the churchyard. There is also a war grave of a World War II airman.

Gallery of St Peter's Church, Leck

See also

Listed buildings in Leck, Lancashire
List of ecclesiastical works by Paley and Austin
List of works by Austin, Paley and Austin

References

Citations

Sources

Diocese of Blackburn
Church of England church buildings in Lancashire
Grade II listed churches in Lancashire
Paley and Austin buildings
Austin and Paley buildings
Gothic Revival church buildings in England
Gothic Revival architecture in Lancashire
Churches in the City of Lancaster